The following is a list of colleges and universities in the U.S. state of  Kansas.

The Kansas Board of Regents governs six state universities and supervises and coordinates 19 community colleges, five technical colleges, six technical schools and a municipal university.  The Board also authorizes private and out-of-state institutions to operate in Kansas with a Certificate of Approval renewed annually.  These schools offer instruction for business trade, technical, or industrial occupations leading to a certificate, diploma, or academic degree.

Private colleges and universities
There are many schools not on this list that have operations in Kansas but do not have their main campus in the state (such as Arkansas State University).

 The Art Institutes International – Kansas City
 Associated Mennonite Biblical Seminary - Great Plains
 Baker University
 Barclay College
 Benedictine College
 Bethany College
 Bethel College
 Brown Mackie
 Central Christian College
 Cleveland University-Kansas City 
 Donnelly College
 Friends University
 Hesston College
 Kansas Christian College
 Kansas Health Science Center–Kansas College of Osteopathic Medicine
 Kansas Wesleyan University
 Manhattan Christian College
 McPherson College
 MidAmerica Nazarene University
 National American University - Overland Park
 Newman University, Wichita
 Ottawa University
 Saint Mary's Academy and College
 Saint Paul School of Theology
 Southwestern College
 Sterling College
 Tabor College
 University of Saint Mary

Public colleges and universities

State universities
 Emporia State University (ESU)
 Fort Hays State University (FHSU)
 Kansas State University (KSU)
 Pittsburg State University (PSU)
 University of Kansas (KU)
 Wichita State University (WSU)

Municipal universities
 Washburn University

Federal or Military colleges and universities
 Haskell Indian Nations University
 United States Army Command and General Staff College

Community colleges 
 Allen Community College
 Barton Community College
 Butler Community College
 Cloud County Community College
 Coffeyville Community College
 Colby Community College
 Cowley Community College
 Dodge City Community College
 Fort Scott Community College
 Garden City Community College
 Highland Community College
 Hutchinson Community College
 Independence Community College
 Johnson County Community College
 Kansas City Kansas Community College
 Labette Community College
 Neosho County Community College
 Pratt Community College
 Seward County Community College

Technical colleges and schools
 AIB International
 Flint Hills Technical College
 Manhattan Area Technical College
 Pinnacle Career Institute
 North Central Kansas Technical College
 Northwest Kansas Technical College
 Salina Area Technical College
 Washburn Institute of Technology
 WSU Tech

See also

 List of college athletic programs in Kansas
 List of defunct colleges and universities in Kansas
 List of high schools in Kansas
 Higher education in the United States
 Lists of American institutions of higher education
 List of recognized higher education accreditation organizations

References

External links
 Department of Education listing of accredited institutions in Kansas
 Kansas Board of Regents

Kansas
Universities and colleges